María del Carmen Denise Ireta González (born 4 January 1980), known as Denise Ireta, is a Mexican former women's international footballer who played as a midfielder. She is a member of the Mexico women's national football team. She was part of the team at the 1999 FIFA Women's World Cup.

References

1980 births
Living people
Mexican women's footballers
Mexico women's international footballers
Place of birth missing (living people)
1999 FIFA Women's World Cup players
Women's association football midfielders
21st-century Mexican women
20th-century Mexican women